Mei is a romanized spelling of a Chinese surname, transcribed in the Mandarin dialect. In Hong Kong and other Cantonese-speaking regions, the name may be transliterated as Mui or Moy. In Vietnam, this surname is written as Mai. In romanized Korean, it is spelled Mae. The name literally translates in English to the plum fruit. The progenitor of the Méi clan, Méi Bo,  originated from near a mountain in ancient China that was lined at its base with plum trees. 

"Mei" is also an Italian surname, and one transcription of the Slavic surname also spelt Mey (Мей).

Origins 

The Méi clan came from the Zi (子) family. They were awarded a kingdom in the southeast of Bo County in Anhui called Mei kingdom. The Méi ancestral hometown is located 60 miles southeast of Runan county, Henan province in central China.

The first patriarch of the Méi lineage was Méi Bo or the Earl of Méi. During King Zhou's reign (Shang Dynasty, 1766-1122 BCE), Méi Bo pleaded repeatedly to King Zhou to repent from his cruel and corrupt ways. Méi Bo's convictions angered the erratic ruler, which he viewed as insubordination. As punishment, the Earl of Méi was beheaded. Inspired by Méi Bo's acts, his descendants subsequently adopted the surname of Méi to pay homage to this ancient noble.

People with the surname Mei (梅) 
 Anita Mui, Hong Kong singer and actress
 James Mui, American musician of Puerto Rican and Chinese descent.
 Mei Ju-ao, jurist of the Tokyo Trial
 Mei Lanfang (1894-1961), Beijing opera actor
 Lexton Moy, American soccer player of Chinese and Filipino heritage
 Mei Lin (actress), Chinese actress
 Milagros Moy, Peruvian volleyball player
 Mei Quong Tart, Australian Chinese businessman
 Mai Thuc Loan, Vietnamese emperor
 Mei Yaochen, Song Dynasty poet
 Moy Yat, Kung Fu master (Wing Chun)
 Jeannie Mai, Chinese-Vietnamese American television presenter, make-up artist, and stylist.

People with the surname Mei (Italian)
 Andrea Mei (born 1989), Italian footballer
 Anna Mei (born 1967), Italian racing cyclist and mountain biker
 Bernardino Mei (1612/15–1676), Italian painter and engraver
 Giovanni Mei (born 1953), Italian retired footballer
 Girolamo Mei (1519–1594), Italian historian and humanist
 Nicola Mei (1985), Italian professional basketball player
 Paolo Mei (1831–1900), Italian painter
 Stefano Mei (born 1963), Italian long-distance runner

People with the surname Mei/Mey (Мей)
 Lev Mei (1822-1862), Russian dramatist and poet
 Lydia Mei (1896-1965), Estonian artist
 Natalie Mei (1900-1975), Estonian painter and graphic artist

References 

Chinese-language surnames
Individual Chinese surnames
Italian-language surnames
Surnames of Slavic origin